Charles Frederick Wishart (1870–1960) was a United States Presbyterian churchman who was President of the College of Wooster from 1919 to 1944.  In 1923 he defeated William Jennings Bryan to become Moderator of the General Assembly of the Presbyterian Church in the United States of America at the height of the Fundamentalist–Modernist Controversy.

Biography

Charles F. Wishart was born in Ontario, Ohio on September 3, 1870, the youngest of the twelve children of Sarah (Irvine) Wishart and the Rev. William Wishart. On July 6, 1904, he married Josephine Long. They had three children, Sara (MacMillan), James Hunt, and Josephine Bosworth (Hayford).

Wishart received his early education in Ontario and Hayesville, Ohio. He graduated from Monmouth College (Illinois) in 1894, where he was Phi Beta Kappa. He then took a graduate degree from Pittsburgh Theological Seminary.

He was ordained as a minister of the United Presbyterian Church of North America in 1897. In 1897, he founded 11th United Presbyterian Church in Pittsburgh, serving as its pastor until 1910. He served as president of the National Young Peoples Christian Union in 1897. From 1910 to 1914, he was a professor of systematic theology at Pittsburgh Theological Seminary.

In 1914, Wishart became the pastor of Second Presbyterian Church in Chicago, joining the Presbyterian Church in the United States of America at this time. He held this position until 1919. During this time, he served as a lecturer at McCormick Theological Seminary from 1915 to 1917. He was a member of the General Board of Christian Education of the Presbyterian Church in the United States of America from 1917 to 1919.

He left Chicago in 1919 to become president of the College of Wooster, where he served until his retirement in 1944. He served as Moderator of the Synod of Ohio in 1929.

He died in 1960.

Wishart Hall was built to honor him in 1966 with a gift from the citizens of Wayne County as a home for the Communications Department which also houses the Friedlander Speech and Hearing Clinic.

Controversy over the teaching of evolution and contest with William Jennings Bryan
The college had taught the theory of evolution for several decades when Wishart became president, and the college library carved the name of learned men on a frieze in the main reading room that included Socrates, Moses, Plato, and Darwin. The instructor of the biology and zoology courses took pains to argue the compatibility of evolution and Christianity, but William Jennings Bryan denounced evolution when he came to Wooster in 1923, declaring that "it is better to know the Rock of Ages than the age of rocks." 

Wishart defended the teaching of evolution at the college, and the issue became heated. At the 1923 General Assembly met in May, 1923, in Indianapolis, Indiana, the college's position and Bryan's disagreement with it were widely known. The New York Times reported that the nominations of Bryan and Wishart meant that "in a measure, the Presbyterian Church is being divided into evolutionists and anti-evolutionists." Bryan led on the first two ballots, but on the third ballot, two candidates from California withdrew and threw their support to Wishart, giving him a 451 to 427 victory.

Chief publications
 The God of the Unexpected Wooster, OH: Wooster College Press, 1923
 The New Freedom in the Natural Order. New York: The Macmillan Company, 1931
 The Bible in Our Day: a Symposium. New York: American Bible Society, 1935
 The Book of Day: A Study in the Revelation of St. John. New York: Oxford University Press, 1935

Notes

References
 Charles Frederick Wishart, Jean Snyder Felt, Memoirs of Charles Frederick Wishart, 1870-1960 (S.l.: s.n., 1982).
Lucy Lilian Notestein, Wooster of the Middle West (Kent, Ohio: Kent State University Press, 1971).

 Dr. Charles F. Wishart Wooster Daily Record (Monday 11 April 1960) reprint, Ancestry.co.uk

External links

 

1870 births
1960 deaths
College of Wooster faculty
Monmouth College alumni
Pittsburgh Theological Seminary alumni
Presbyterian Church in the United States of America ministers
People from Richland County, Ohio
American Presbyterians